The 1985–86 Essex Senior Football League season was the 15th in the history of Essex Senior Football League, a football competition in England.

League table

The league featured 16 clubs which competed in the league last season, along with one new club:
Burnham Ramblers, joined from the Essex Olympian League

League table

References

Essex Senior Football League seasons
1985–86 in English football leagues